Finn halls or Finnish halls were cultural centers of Finnish diaspora communities and labor organizations in the United States and Canada.

Notable Finn halls
Finnish Labour Temple,  Thunder Bay, Ontario
Round Finn Hall, Waino, Wisconsin

References

Further reading

Reino Nikolai Hannula, An Album of Finnish Halls. San Luis Obispo, CA: Finn Heritage, 1991, 
 K-G Olin, Guld och röda skogar, INBUNDEN, Svenska, 2002, 

Finnish-American history
Finnish-Canadian institutions
Cultural centers